Guanylurea dinitramide (FOX-12 or GUDN) is a novel insensitive high explosive.

History
GUDN was discovered by Abraham Langlet, a chemist at the Swedish Defence Research Agency, and patented in 1997. The moniker FOX-12 stems from the Swedish-language acronym for the Agency, FOI, plus x for "explosive."

Applications

GUDN is particularly valued for its extreme stability and insensitivity.

GUDN found its first major application when mixed with oxidizers such as potassium nitrate or copper nitrate in automotive airbag inflators.

Propellant 
GUDN is also used in a 60/40 mix with RDX as a propellant in the UNIFLEX 2 IM modular artillery charge system fielded in the BAE 155mm/L52 Archer howitzer.

Explosive 
Blended in equal parts with TNT, GUDN forms the a melt-castable explosive known as GUNTOL. A variation adding 15% Aluminum is known as GUNTONAL.

Explosive character 
Upon detonation, GUDN undergoes a thermal decomposition which is not entirely understood as of 2021. The calculated detonation velocity is 8235 m/s, with a detonation pressure of 25.89 GPa, and a detonation temperature of 2887 K.

Synthesis 
GUDN is synthesized by a reaction of Ammonium dinitramide and the sulfate salt of guanylurea.

See also 

 FOX-7, another high explosive developed by the Swedish Defense Research Agency

References

Ureas
Nitro compounds
Explosives